Line 20 is a rapid transit line in the Shenzhen Metro system.

Construction started on 24 November 2016. The National Development and Reform Commission approved the project in March 2020. It  opened on 28 December 2021, after being delayed since 2018.

Stations

Phase 2
The line is 34 km in length.

Rolling stock
It's the first time that Shenzhen Metro use automatic train operation. The GoA4 construction standard is applied to Phase I of Shenzhen Metro Line 20, which can fully achieve the automatic operation of unattended trains after opening, and the trains can also automatically sleep, wake up and conduct self inspection. In addition, the train also has more than ten functions, such as train stop control, door platform door alignment isolation, etc.

References

Shenzhen Metro lines
Railway lines opened in 2021